Straneotia moi, the snake-head slim arboreal carabid, is a species of beetle in the family Carabidae. It is found in French Guiana.

They are macropterous and capable of flight. Standard body length is 5.35 mm. Elytra, forebody, and head markedly shiny. Antenna moderately long. Pronotum very narrow.

References

Lebiinae
Beetles described in 2018